Thirumarayoor is a small village situated around 7 km from Piravom in the Ernakulam district of Kerala, India. A sub-post office of Arakunnam (PIN-682313) and a co-operative bank are the only public firms operating here. The main income of people in Thirumarayoor is from agriculture. Rubber, rice and coconut are the main agricultural products.

The name "Thirumarayoor" originated from an event linked with the epic of "Ramayana". Seetha was attracted by a golden deer, which was originally the Marreecha who disguised as a deer, as part of the plot of Ravana to keep Rama away and steal Seetha. While Rama was chasing the deer, it disappeared at this place. The word in Malayalam for "disappear" is "marayuka". "Thiru" is indicating something related to God and "ooru" is the place. Thus the name Thiru-mara-ooru (Thirumarayoor) was originated. This village consists of a bank, an agricultural society, many paddy fields, fishing spots, etc.

 The club Navachetana Kala Samidhi is situated here, and promotes the cultural as well as sports activities in Thirumarayoor and its surrounding areas. The Vadam Vali (Tug of War) is conducted (yearly) by Navachethana Kala Samidhi and is considered as the best entertainment programme in Edakkattuvayal Panchayat area . Another club here is "The Royals Mangidapilly".
 Mr Jain K. Punnoos is now the Ward Member of Thirumarayoor

Places of interest
 Ramaswamy temple. It is a beautifully sculptured ancient and one of few Rama temples in Kerala. It is situated in a tiny land surrounded by paddy field.
 The St Mary's Simhasana Church Vadayaparamb (2 km),The Mar Bahnan Orthodox Syrian Church, Vadayaparamb (2.3 km),The St. George Orthodox Syrian Church, Thirumarayoor (0.3 km),The St. Thomas Knanaya Catholic Church, Thirumarayoor (1 km), kilo meters from Thirumarayoor junction).
 The U. P school, mangidapilly & St. Michael High School are just on walkable distance from here.
The village is 35 km from Kochi. Nearby places are Veliyanad and Thottoor.

References

External links 
 Thirumarayoor Sree Rama SWamy Temple

Villages in Ernakulam district